O. sinica  may refer to:
 Odorrana sinica, a frog species endemic to China
 Orithyia sinica, the tiger crab or tiger face crab, a singularly unusual crab species